Aranza Salut was the defending champion, but chose not to participate.

Verónica Cepede Royg won the title, defeating Adriana Pérez 7–6(7–4), 7–5 in the final.

Seeds

Main draw

Finals

Top half

Bottom half

References 
 Main draw

MasterCard Tennis Cup - Singles
MasterCard Tennis Cup
Mast